Burn 'Em Up O'Connor is a 1939 race car film directed by Edward Sedgwick and starring Dennis O'Keefe, Cecilia Parker, Nat Pendleton and Harry Carey. The screenplay was written by Milton Merlin and Byron Morgan from the novel Salute to the Gods by racing driver and journalist Malcolm Campbell.  The cinematographer was Lester White and the picture was produced by an uncredited Harry Rapf.  The supporting cast features Charley Grapewin, Alan Curtis and Tom Neal, with a brief appearance by Clayton Moore.

Cast
Dennis O'Keefe	 ...	
Jerry O'Connor
Cecilia Parker	 ...	
Jane Delano
Nat Pendleton	 ...	
Buddy Buttle
Harry Carey	 ...	
P. G. 'Pinky' Delano
Addison Richards	 ...	
Ed Eberhart
Charley Grapewin	 ...	
'Doc' Heath
Alan Curtis	 ...	
Jose 'Rocks' Rivera
Tom Neal	 ...	
'Hank' Hogan
Tom Collins	 ...	
'Lefty' Simmons
Frank Orth	 ...	
Tim 'Mac' McKelvy
Frank M. Thomas	 ...	
Jim Nixon
Si Jenks	 ...	
Mr. Jenkins
Clayton Moore	 ...	
Hospital Intern (billed as Jack Carlton)

External links
 ''Burn 'Em Up O'Connor in the Internet Movie Database
 Burn 'Em Up O'Connor at Turner Classic Movies
 Burn 'Em O'Connor at The Video Beat
 Burn 'Em Up O'Connor original trailer at TCM Trailers

American auto racing films
1939 films
Films directed by Edward Sedgwick
American black-and-white films
Films produced by Harry Rapf
1930s sports films
1930s English-language films
1930s American films